The Great Seal of the State of Nebraska was adopted by the Nebraska legislature on June 15, 1867. It depicts a blacksmith working at an anvil along with various other symbols related to Nebraska during the early days of its statehood.

Description 

The 1867 legislative act that established the seal describes it in these words:

History 

Legislation describing the seal and requiring the secretary of state to procure an instrument to stamp the seal was passed in 1867, with $25 appropriated for the purchase. A cast-iron press in the shape of a lion's head was purchased to imprint the seal. The identity of the artist who designed and engraved the seal is unknown. It may have been a jeweler in Omaha.

Bertram Goodhue, the architect of the Nebraska State Capitol, proposed a new state seal in 1921. The Nebraska legislature rejected his redesign in 1925, and placed the existing state seal on an official state banner. This design was designated the Flag of Nebraska in 1963.

The lion's head press was used for official business for 138 years, when it was retired by Secretary of State John A. Gale because it was in danger of breaking. It was replaced by a toggle-hand press.

Criticism 

The Nebraska State Journal gently criticized the design in 1921, finding the 1867 seal "archaic in conception and mediocre in drawing" though still interesting and nostalgic. The newspaper noted that "the Rocky Mountains never belonged in the picture" because they are not located in Nebraska.

One hundred years later (in 2021) the newspaper renewed its criticism, adding that because the seal depicts the Missouri River (which forms the border of Nebraska) some of the land shown on the seal is located in Iowa.

See also 
List of Nebraska state symbols
Flag of Nebraska

References

External links 
Nebraska State Statute 84-501. URL last accessed July 4, 2006.
Nebraska Secretary of State: The Great Seal of Nebraska. URL last accessed July 4, 2006.

Symbols of Nebraska
Nebraska
Nebraska
Nebraska
Nebraska
Nebraska
Nebraska
Nebraska